Matko is a Croatian given name and surname that may refer to:

Given name
Matko Babić (born 1998), Croatian football player 
Matko Djarmati (born 1982), Croatian football player
Matko Jelavić (born 1958), Croatian singer, songwriter, composer and drummer
Matko Laginja (1852–1930), Croatian lawyer and politician
Matko Obradović (born 1991), Croatian football goalkeeper 
Matko Perdijić (born 1982), Croatian football goalkeeper
Matko Talovac, Governor of Slavonia from 1435 to 1445
Matko Vekić (born 1970), Croatian painter 

Surname
Matija Matko (born 1982), Croatian football player

See also
Matthew (given name)

Croatian masculine given names
Croatian surnames